The following elections occurred in 1801:

North America

United States
 1801 New York gubernatorial election
 United States Senate election in New York, 1801

Europe

United Kingdom
 1801 United Kingdom general election

See also
 :Category:1801 elections

1801
Elections